Weiron Tan (born 3 December 1994) is a Malaysian racing driver.

Career

Karting 
Weiron was first introduced to go-karts at the age of 13, and by the age of 15 he was the first Malaysian champion in the PLUS Yamaha SL Cup Championship and the same year saw him emerge as vice champion in the Asian Karting Open Championship. In 2011, Weiron made his racing debut in Europe, competing in the WSK Series under the Works Kosmic Racing Kart Team. Weiron was also the only Malaysian among 6 other young international drivers chosen in the AirAsia Team Lotus Driver Development Program in 2011, later known as Caterham F1 Academy.

Lotus GT4 Supercup Asia 
In 2011, Weiron took part in the Lotus GT4 Supercup Asia Series as the youngest contender and saw him win the championship with the most wins, podium finishes and pole positions.

JK Asia Series 
In 2012 Weiron competed a part-season of the single-seater championship JK Asia Series.

Formula Gulf 1000 
Later in 2012, he took part in selected rounds of Formula Gulf 1000 as well, the series in which he scored his first Formula race victory in Abu Dhabi. He followed that up with a double race win at the next meet and a fourth win at the season finale in Dubai, taking four victories from a possible six.

Formula Renault 2.0 
In April 2013 Weiron embarked in the Protyre Formula Renault 2.0 Championship, the UK based junior single-seater series with Fortec Motorsport. He made a huge impact, scoring five race wins and nine podium finishes to secure runner-up in the championship.

German Formula 3 
2014 saw Weiron move up to the ATS Formel 3 Cup with Van Amersfoort Racing. The start of the season proved challenging as he acclimatised to the new series and car, but he rounded out the year with a string of strong results, including five podium finishes and two race wins towards the end of the season finishing fifth overall.

Pro Mazda Championship 
Ahead of the 2015 season, Weiron made the move to the United States to compete in the Pro Mazda Championship with Andretti Autosport, a series which forms a major step in the Road to Indy programme. Ahead of the start of the season, he competed in the five-race Winterfest, a key learning opportunity for him to compete in the cars. He immediately impressed, scoring two dominant race wins and three second places on his way to taking vice-champion honours. In the main series he had a successful rookie year, finishing fourth in the overall standings, scoring four victories and six podium finishes along the way. Weiron became the first ever Malaysian in history to win in the US and on an oval race. He continues with the series in 2016, joining championship winning outfit Team Pelfrey, of which he only competed in the first two rounds.

China GT Championship 
In 2017, Weiron made a full-time switch to sportscar racing, debuting in the China GT Series with Absolute Racing competing in a Bentley GT3.

FIA World Endurance Championship 
2018 saw Weiron compete in the final two rounds of the 2017-2018 Asian Le Mans Series with Jackie Chan DC Racing, with the full support of Sepang International Circuit, Weiron was one of the Malaysian trio selected alongside teammates Jazeman Jaafar and Afiq Ikhwan. The trio successfully won on their debut at Round 3, Buriram in the LMP2 category. The result later sparked interest in the team to enter the drivers in the 2018-2019 FIA World Endurance Championship super season to compete for the world title. Weiron and his teammates Jazeman Jaafar and Nabil Jeffri made a very impressive debut season finishing fourth overall having only competed five of the eight rounds in the season due to the unfortunate event of Sepang International Circuit pulling out from the championship. The trio finished fourth in class at their 24 Hours of Le Mans debut, later on a second-place finish at Silverstone before securing their first victory at Fuji making history as the first ever all-Asian lineup to win on the world championship.

Blancpain GT World Challenge Asia 
After a successful 2018 season, Weiron was picked up by Audi Sport Asia as an official driver to compete in the GT World Challenge Asia Series with Audi Sport Asia Team Absolute. Alongside teammate Martin Rump, they racked up four podium finishes and two wins during the season, finishing sixth overall.

Racing record

Career summary

† As Tan was a guest driver, he was ineligible to score points.

Pro Mazda Championship

NOTE:  The first Indianapolis Motor Speedway race was scored as the second NOLA Motorsports Park race because of weather.

Complete FIA World Endurance Championship results
(key) (Races in bold indicate pole position; races in italics indicate fastest lap)

24 Hours of Le Mans results

References

External links 
 
 

1994 births
Living people
Sportspeople from Kuala Lumpur
Malaysian racing drivers
German Formula Three Championship drivers
24 Hours of Le Mans drivers
FIA Formula 3 European Championship drivers
Indy Pro 2000 Championship drivers
FIA World Endurance Championship drivers
Carlin racing drivers
Asian Le Mans Series drivers
FIA Motorsport Games drivers
Aston Martin Racing drivers
EuroInternational drivers
Van Amersfoort Racing drivers
Andretti Autosport drivers
Team Pelfrey drivers
Fortec Motorsport drivers
Formula Renault BARC drivers
Jota Sport drivers
Michelin Pilot Challenge drivers